The rock cook (Centrolabrus exoletus), or small-mouthed wrasse, is a species of marine ray-finned fish from the wrasse family Labridae which is found in the eastern Atlantic Ocean off the coasts of Europe.

Description

Its mouth is relatively small and has thick, fleshy lips. This species is normally reddish-brown above fading to yellowish-silver on the flanks and to pale silvery-white on the belly. The males have iridescent blue streaks on their dorsal, anal and caudal fins as well as on their heads. The caudal fin has a dark vertical bar. There is a single row of small teeth in the jaws.

Distribution
The rock cook is found in the eastern Atlantic where it is endemic to European waters from Norway to Portugal. It has been claimed off eastern Greenland but these records are regarded as doubtful. It is absent from the Baltic Sea and has been observed once in the Mediterranean Sea off Málaga in 1981. In the waters off Britain and Ireland it is absent from the eastern English Channel and the eastern coast of England.

Habitat and biology
The female creates a nest from fine seaweeds in which she lays her eggs during the summer months. Its diet consists of small benthic invertebrates, especially crustaceans. The rock cook also acts as a cleaner fish and a study off the coast of the Algarve, Portugal found that it was the most important species of cleaner fish present in that area. It is a facultative cleaner fish which rather than maintain a territory where its client fish seek it out small groups of rock cooks actively search for client fish, primarily the brown wrasse in this study, and clean and consume crustacean ectoparasites, all from the family Gnathiidae, off the client fish.

Human uses
The rock cook is used in the aquaculture of the Atlantic salmon as a cleaner fish.

Taxonomy
Centrolabrus exoletus is the type species of the genus Centrolabrus. It was originally formally described by Carolus Linnaeus in 1758 in the 10th Edition of the Systema Naturae.

References

Fish described in 1758
Taxa named by Carl Linnaeus
Rock cook